Alicia Olatuja is a mezzo-soprano and graduate of the Manhattan School of Music.  She has made her professional debut as Sacagawea at the Opera Memphis and at Carnegie Hall, UVA, and The Kennedy Center.  She has sung with the Brooklyn Tabernacle Choir since 2007. She holds a bachelor's degree from the University of Missouri's School of Music in Columbia, Missouri.

Her solo at the Second inauguration of Barack Obama gained her international attention.

She had released an album "The Promise" in the preceding January, as the Olatuja Project, with her Nigerian born husband Michael Olatuja, himself a successful jazz bassist. Alicia sang some Nigerian lyrics, including in the Yoruba language. Later that year she released "In The Dark" as a single, and the next year included it in her album "Timeless". In 2019 she released "Intuition: Songs From The Minds Of Women".

Alicia performed at the Monterey Jazz Festival in 2017. She tours extensively, performs vocal arranging as well as singing, and operates the on-line Vocal Breakthrough Academy, an adaptation to the disruption of the Covid-19 pandemic. 

She sings “Pilgrimage” on track 6 of Dr. Lonnie Smith's 2021 cd “Breathe” (Blue Note Records)

References

Year of birth missing (living people)
Living people
American mezzo-sopranos
University of Missouri alumni
University of Missouri School of Music alumni
21st-century American women